On 21 September 2013, four masked gunmen attacked the Westgate shopping mall, an upscale mall in Nairobi, Kenya. There are conflicting reports about the number killed in the attack, since part of the mall collapsed due to a fire that started during the siege. The attack resulted in 71 total deaths, including 62 civilians, five Kenyan soldiers, and all four gunmen. Approximately 200 people were wounded in the massacre.

The extremist Islamic group al-Shabaab claimed responsibility for the incident, which it characterised as retribution for the Kenyan military's deployment in the group's home country of Somalia. Many media outlets also suspected the insurgent group's involvement in the attack based on earlier reprisal warnings it had issued in the wake of Operation Linda Nchi from 2011 to 2012.

Kenyan authorities arrested dozens of people in the aftermath of the attack, but had not announced any suspects directly related to the siege. On 4 November 2013, a Kenyan court charged four Somali nationals with harbouring the gunmen in their homes, with each pleading not guilty.

On 20 September 2015, Foreign Policy magazine reported the Westgate attack on 21 September lasted several hours, with the last victim killed before special Kenyan security forces entered the mall. The mall was officially declared secured on 24 September.

Background

The incident followed threats from Al-Shabaab in late 2011 of attacks in Kenya in retaliation for Operation Linda Nchi, a coordinated military operation in southern Somalia that was launched against the group by the Somali Armed Forces and Kenya Defence Forces. One week before the incident and a month after United Nations warnings of possible attacks, Kenyan police claimed to have disrupted a major attack in its final stages of planning after arresting two people with grenades, AK-47 assault rifles, and suicide vests packed with ball bearings. The two suspects were from a Nairobi neighbourhood where Somali immigrants live. A manhunt was also launched for eight more suspects. The Sunday Telegraph claimed that it had seen United Nations documents that warned that in the previous month the threat of an "attempted large-scale attack" in Kenya was "elevated." After the incident, Nairobi senator Mike Sonko claimed that he had warned the security services of a possible attack three months previously. The country was celebrating the International Day of Peace when the incident took place.

Shootings and initial siege

On Saturday 21 September 2013, at about noon, at least four masked assailants (initially claimed by the government to be between 10 and 15) attacked the Westgate shopping mall, the most upscale mall in Nairobi, in its Westlands district. Fighting with armed police continued over 48 hours later. Cameras in the mall revealed the gunmen carried assault rifles and wore civilian clothing. There were additional reports of grenade explosions. Police surrounded the area and urged residents to stay away. A report indicated that about 80 people were trapped in the basement, but police said that they had escorted some shoppers to safety and were trying to capture the gunmen. The Secretary-General of the Kenya Red Cross Society, Abbas Gullet, said that rescue workers could not reach some of the patrons in the mall. Inspector General of Police David Kimaiyo wrote that there were "police at the scene and the area [was] surrounded."

Rob Van Dijk, an employee of the Dutch embassy, said that while he was eating at a restaurant the attack started with grenades and was followed by gunfire as patrons screamed and dropped to the ground. Other witnesses said the attack began at the outdoor seating area of Artcaffe at the front of the mall. An Artcaffe employee, Patrick Kuria, said: "We started by hearing gunshots downstairs and outside. Later we heard them come inside. We took cover. Then we saw two gunmen wearing black turbans. I saw them shoot." Some of the casualties were at the entrance to the mall after the assailants moved outside and a stand-off then commenced with police. Ambulances were present at the mall as rescuers started moving emerging victims. Reports indicated children were among the victims, and patrons that were carrying small children were among those trapped. Mall security guards used shopping carts to ferry out wounded children.

Nation TV footage showed dozens of people escaping from a back entrance. Bloomberg correspondent Marco Lui was on the second floor of the mall when the attack started; he said that two explosions happened within about five minutes of each other. "We heard a noise from the ground floor and people started running to the parking area on the rooftop. They were panicking and then the second blast went off and people were even more panicked." Other eyewitnesses said that in addition to grenades, the attackers used AK-47s. Twenty people were rescued from a toy shop on the upper floor. As the Kenyan army troops arrived, they used tear gas to try to smoke out the attackers from the cinema complex. Vehicles riddled with bullet holes were left abandoned in front of the mall. Kimaiyo said: "Our officers are on the ground carrying out an evacuation of those inside as they search for the attackers who are said to be inside." A police officer said that the gunmen were barricaded inside the Nakumatt supermarket. He indicated that there were three bodies there while he pointed to a pool of blood by a children's shoe shop. He then pointed to a hamburger bar where music still played and indicated more bodies were found there.

Rescue efforts

Goran Tomasevic, Reuters chief photographer for East Africa, recorded the first few hours of the attacks in which he described extremely distressed people including children, women and men bleeding from the impact of shrapnel and gunshots. Abdul Yusuf Haji, son of former Defence Minister of Kenya Mohamed Yusuf Haji, on receiving text messages from his brother Noordin Yusuf Haji, an undercover anti-terrorism agent who was stuck inside the shopping center, travelled to the mall with his handgun and entered with other civilian rescuers. He helped rescue a mother and her three daughters, providing cover with other armed rescuers. Tomasevic's photos of the rescue efforts by civilians were beamed all around the world.

Several other armed and unarmed civilians also participated in various rescues. An ex-SAS man, a former member of (ARW) Irish Army Ranger Wing (L.B.) and an off duty member of Diplomatic Protective Services Tactical Response Unit (DPS-TRU) and former British Armed Forces Major Dominic Troulan helped to save lives. They were working as security consultants and they raced to the Westgate mall when al-Shabaab gunmen went on the rampage. Under fire, they organised the rescue of terrified shoppers.  There are several similarities between this rescue by civilians and members of elite forces and the rescue  
at Nairobi DusitD2 complex attack.

By nightfall, the mall remained sealed off to the public while security services searched floor by floor for the gunmen, believed to still be inside with the hostages. People continued to trickle out from hiding places. Internal Security Minister Mutea Iringo then said that the government was in control of the situation. Kimaiyo also wrote that several of the other assailants had been pinned down after security forces moved into the mall. President Uhuru Kenyatta said the security operation was "delicate" and that a top priority was to safeguard hostages. At about 2:30 – an hour after reporting five "visibly shaken" hostages' release – the National Disaster Operation Centre (NDOC) wrote that "major operations underway."

The next evening, after nightfall, over 24 hours after the beginning of the attack, gunfire was still heard at the mall. The military spokesman, Colonel Cyrus Oguna, said that most of the hostages had been released, saying that they were "dehydrated and suffering from shock;" he added that four Kenyan soldiers were injured in the rescue operation. Scores of by-standers gathered by the mall as the operations continued. The NDOC forecast that the operation would end that night. Kenyatta said to the nation that "the criminals are now all located in one place within the building...We have as good a chance to successfully neutralise the terrorists as we can hope for". He also called for patience and said that he had received "numerous offers of assistance from friendly countries." On 23 September, Lenku assured that "we are doing anything reasonably possible, cautiously though, to bring this process to an end", and said that at least three al-Shabab fighters were killed and ten Kenyan soldiers wounded. Eleven other soldiers were also injured that day, and three Kenyan commandos were shot at close range. It was also reported that three floors of the mall collapsed during the attack, trapping some bodies inside.

On the night of 23/24 September, there was a lull in firing, but it resumed in the early morning hours. As the day progressed, police said that they were conducting a final sweep of the complex as the interior ministry released a statement that said the four-day-long assault was "very near the end." The gunmen were still inside. He vowed "full accountability for the mindless destruction, deaths, pain, loss and suffering we have all undergone." The Kenyan Red Cross said that 63 people were still missing. In Nairobi, daily business returned to normal; appeals replenished blood banks, and over US$650,000 was raised to support the affected families.

Israeli involvement
At the time of the attacks, the mall was owned by Israelis, and at least four restaurants in the mall were owned/operated by Israelis, according to Israeli sources. The International Business Times stated that Kenya and Israel had a secret security pact. Israeli military advisers were reported to have participated in the counter-offensive against the hostage takers and to have joined in the fighting, although the Israeli Foreign Ministry refused to confirm or deny the presence of its forces.

Looting
In the days following the initial attack, Kenyan soldiers were sent in the mall to rescue people inside and find the gunmen. Yet when the soldiers were sent in, many of them were caught on camera looting almost every shop in the mall while it was besieged. Two soldiers were arrested and jailed for looting mobile phones and several others were questioned.

Victims

During the siege and for days afterwards, the toll of casualties remained unclear. Eyewitnesses were reported to have seen 50 bodies in the mall. In addition, at first there were reported hostages taken by attackers, but later it became apparent no hostages were ever held, other eyewitnesses also said that they had seen dozens wounded. An unnamed local hospital reported that it was overwhelmed with the number of wounded being brought in and that it had consequently diverted victims to a second facility. At least 71 people were killed, including four terrorists. In addition to numerous Kenyans who were killed, at least 19 foreigners of different nationalities also died. The National Disaster Operation Centre said that the wounded ranged in age from 2 to 78. Sources said 175 people were wounded, including 11 soldiers. There are also claims of torture carried out by the terrorists. Notable victims included Kenyan journalist Ruhila Adatia-Sood, President Uhuru Kenyatta's nephew Mbugua Mwangi and his fiancée Rosemary Wahito, Ghanaian poet and diplomat Kofi Awoonor and Canadian diplomat Annemarie Desloges. Kenyan interior minister Joseph Ole Lenku said Israelis were not targeted. "This time, the story is not about Israel. The minister is saying that this is an internal Kenyan issue. His security forces tell him that this terror organisation was not targeting Israelis."

Most of the victims were from Kenya’s business and political elite, as well as expatriates and the diplomatic community.

Investigation
British police officers based in Kenya arrived on the scene to help Kenyan counter-terrorism officials, and Kenyan officials began an investigation. Security was also tightened in public places across Kenya. Ten arrests were reported on 24 September. In announcing the end of operations, Kenyatta said "forensic investigations are underway to establish the nationalities of all those involved" and suggested that a British woman and two or three Americans "may have been involved in the attack" but that could not be confirmed at the time. Kenyan Defence Chief, General Julius Karangi, said the attackers were from "different countries."

The National Intelligence Service (NIS) was strongly criticised for failing to warn of the attack after The Star reported that two unnamed NIS officers had told it that the NIS had passed warnings about an attack to the police, and that a pregnant woman had been warned by her brother, an NIS officer, not to visit the Westgate mall that Saturday "because she would not be able to run with her bulging tummy". The Observer reported that Kenya had prior intelligence of an attack in Nairobi, and that there were reports of NIS agents being at Westgate a few hours before the attack. From its start, the investigation was hampered by a wide range of conflicting eyewitness testimony about the number of attackers, the gunmen's true identities, and even their ultimate fates. Over sixty persons were listed by the Red Cross as missing, though police asserted that they were all among the dead; in news reports, some have been described as additional terrorists who escaped alive, though the Kenyan government firmly denies this.

It was reported on 10 October that the police, army, and intelligence services had been engaging in "blame games" after the attack. Some international forensic teams had reportedly returned home, frustrated that they were not allowed full access to the mall.

Perpetrators
Initially, the Ministry of Interior said: "It is a possibility that it is an attack by terrorists, so we are treating the matter very seriously." Nairobi police chief Benson Kibue called the incident a "terrorist" attack and added that there were likely no more than 10 perpetrators involved. Senator Billow Kerow from Mandera County, Nairobi said: "It's too early to know what kind of people these are, but from what we are getting, these are people who speak in the Swahili language. They are people who seem to know what they are doing, are pretty much organised. It's really quite a shocking thing because from what we're getting, they aren't ordinary thugs."

An eyewitness said that the attackers had told Muslims to leave and that non-Muslims would be targeted. Others were asked to name the mother of the Islamic prophet Muhammad to distinguish Muslims from non-Muslims. They also distinguished Muslims from non-Muslims by asking others to recite the shahadah. To Associated Press, the al-Shabaab called it "a meticulous vetting process ... to separate the Muslims from the Kuffar". Gunmen were seen on CCTV talking on mobile phones and bowing down in Islamic prayer between their attacks.

Interior Cabinet Secretary Joseph Lenku said that between 10 and 15 gunmen were involved in the attack and that Kenyan forces had control of security cameras installed inside the shopping complex. Witnesses who managed to escape also asserted that they heard some of the gunmen speaking either Arabic or Somali. After several hours, Al-Shabaab claimed responsibility for the attack. According to Kenya's Capital FM, one attacker is reported to have escaped after a witness spotted him mingling with the victims as they were being rescued. Foreign Minister Amina Mohamed said that Al-Shabaab was not acting alone and the assault was part of an international campaign of terror; and that "two or three" US citizens and a Briton were among the attackers. "Al-Shabab [sic] are looking for relevance on an international scale – especially after a change of leadership – and is looking to send the message that they are still a force to be reckoned with." The suggestion that there had been a British perpetrator in their ranks was strongly rejected by Al-Shabaab. Kenyan officials later lowered the estimated number of gunmen to four to six militants. Among the shooters, a military spokesman named Abu Baara al Sudani (a Sudanese national), Omar Nabhan (a Kenyan Arab), Khattab al Kene (a Somali from Mogadishu), and Umayr (of unidentified background). Norway's intelligence agency, the PST, later announced in early October that it had sent officers to Kenya to investigate reports alleging that a Norwegian citizen of Somali origin, named as Hassan Abdi Dhuhulow, was also involved in the planning and execution of the attack. The 23-year-old Dhuhulow was in 2015 confirmed to have been a perpetrator and to have died during the attack. Having migrated to Norway in 1999, Dhuhulow had previously been under surveillance by PST. On 18 October it was reported that two bodies found in the ruins of part of the centre, with AK-47 rifles beside them, were likely to be those of two of the attackers.

Before it was banned, a Twitter account claiming to represent al-Shabaab posted a series of messages alleging that the attacks were "just retribution" for crimes committed by Kenya's military. "For long we have waged war against the Kenyans in our land, now it's time to shift the battleground and take the war to their land", said one post. "The attack at #WestgateMall is just a very tiny fraction of what Muslims in Somalia experience at the hands of Kenyan invaders," said another. They warned the Kenyan government that any attempt by Kenyan forces to attempt a roof landing would jeopardise the lives of hostages. Twitter suspended the account before the attack had ended.

A group spokesman, Sheikh Ali Mohamud Rage, said: "If you want Kenya in peace, it will not happen as long as your boys are in [Somalia]." Another Al-Shabaab spokesman, Sheikh Abdul-Aziz Abu Muscab, told Al Jazeera that the attack was in retaliation for Kenyan troops entering Somalia and that the timing was deliberately chosen to be a surprise attack. al-Shabaab repeated their demands for Kenya's withdrawal from Somalia. On the day the operation ended, Rage threatened further "black days" unless Kenya withdrew its troops from Somalia and said that the siege was just "a taste of what we will do."

Kenyan authorities arrested dozens of people in the aftermath of the attack, but had not announced any suspects directly related to the siege. On 4 November 2013, four individuals reported to be Somali nationals were charged by a Kenyan court in relation to the attack. Identified as Mohammed Ahmed Abdi, Liban Abdullah, Adnan Ibrahim and Hussein Hassan, they were accused of supporting terrorist elements in Kenya, harboring the gunmen in their homes, illicitly registering as a Kenyan citizen, and obtaining false identification documents. However, none of the men were accused of being the shooters involved in the siege, the latter of whom Kenyan military officials asserted had all died. All four of the accused men pleaded not guilty to the allegations, with no attorney representing them. The court ordered the men to be detained until a hearing in a week's time.

A separate investigation of the attack was conducted by the New York Police Department (NYPD). The report's findings, released in December, 2013, suggested that the attack had been carried out by only four Al-Shabaab terrorists, all of whom most likely escaped the mall alive. However, an investigation conducted between Kenyan and US State Department officials suggested that while there were only four gunmen who carried out the attack, they were all likely killed during the standoff. Lt. Kevin Yorke of the NYPD's Intelligence Division also acknowledged that the NYPD investigation, which did not have representatives among the group of western investigators assisting Kenya with the probe, was "based solely on open-source information we gathered and is unclassified."

The Al-Shabaab member believed to have been the 'mastermind' behind the mall attack, Adan Garar, was reported as being killed after a drone strike on 12 March 2015. Garar was in a vehicle hit by a missile near the town of Dinsoor in southern Somalia.

On October 7, 2020, a Kenyan court sentenced three defendants accused of helping Islamic militants in 2013 in preparation for an attack on Nairobi’s shopping mall. More than 140 witnesses were heard in the case before the verdict was handed down. In the verdict, Nairobi Chief Magistrate Francis Andayi ruled that Hussein Hassan Mustafa and Mohammed Ahmed Abdi found guilty of conspiracy to commit a terrorist act. In the case of the third defendant, there was not enough evidence to prove the conspiracy charge, so he was acquitted. Earlier, in January 2019, an accused had also been acquitted in the same case for lack of evidence. However, after proving the prosecution's charge, Otsieno Namwaya, a senior Africa researcher at Human Rights Watch, claimed that neither the attackers nor the masterminds had been brought to justice now, the convicts were only bystanders in the case.

Reactions

Domestic
The attack has been described as one of the worst acts of terrorism in Kenya since the bombing of the U.S. embassy in 1998. President Uhuru Kenyatta said on national television that Kenya had "overcome terrorist attacks before" and vowed to "hunt down the perpetrators wherever they run".

On 10 October 2013, it was reported that President Kenyatta had admitted that the Westgate operation was "bungled", and undertook to carry out a complete investigation. The Kenyan Cabinet was expected to establish a formal commission of inquiry.

International bodies
The African Union's Chairperson of the African Union Commission Nkosazana Dlamini-Zuma condemned the attacks and reiterated that the AU would continue in its fight against al-Shabaab. She also expressed the AU's solidarity with the government and people of Kenya. The European Union offered its support. UN Secretary-General Ban Ki-moon expressed "alarm" and offered Kenyatta solidarity. The United Nations Security Council condemned the attack and called on Kenya to note that any response must comply with international human rights law.

Interpol Secretary-General Ronald Noble condemned the assault and pledged full support to Kenyan authorities in their investigation, offering to deploy an Incident Response Team consisting of specialised forensic officers, counter-terrorism experts, operational assistants and analysts. Noble, in an interview with ABC, indicated that in the face of large 'soft' targets, governments have a choice: security clearances at entrances or allow the citizenry to carry guns for self-defence.

States
Many countries expressed their condemnation of the attacks and sympathy for those affected, including Argentina, Canada, Chile, China, Colombia, Eritrea, Hungary, India, Iran, Israel, Italy, Serbia, Somalia, Tanzania, the United States, Venezuela, and Trinidad and Tobago. Some restated their condemnation during the General debate of the sixty-eighth session of the United Nations General Assembly.

Somali President Hassan Sheikh Mohamud condemned the "heartless acts against defenceless civilians" and pledged to "stand shoulder to shoulder with Kenya." He also cautioned against prejudgement, saying that "we don't have any proof that the people who did this are Somali."

King Mohammed VI of Morocco expressed "profound emotion and indignation"; Tanzanian President Jakaya Kikwete and South African President Jacob Zuma also expressed condolences and reiterated support for Kenyan and international efforts "aimed at peacekeeping, stability, democracy and nation-building in Somalia." Sahrawi Arab Democratic Republic President and Secretary-General of the Polisario Front, Mohamed Abdelaziz expressed "sadness and dismay about the shocking and cowardly massacre" and offered his country's "deepest condolences" and "heartfelt sympathy".

See also

1998 United States embassy bombings
2002 Mombasa attacks
2011–14 terrorist attacks in Kenya
2013 Nairobi bus attack
2019 Nairobi hotel attack
Robert Alai
Garissa University College attack
List of Islamist terrorist attacks
Terrorism in Kenya

References

External links

2013 mass shootings in Africa
2010s in Nairobi
Attacks on supermarkets
Attacks on tourists
Al-Shabaab (militant group) attacks
Filmed killings
Hate crimes
Hostage taking
Islamic terrorism in Kenya
Islamic terrorist incidents in 2013
Mass murder in 2013
Mass murder in Nairobi
Mass shootings in Africa
September 2013 crimes in Africa
Attacks on shopping malls
Terrorist incidents in Kenya in 2013
2013 Westgate shopping mall attack
2013 murders in Kenya
21st-century mass murder in Africa
Israel–Kenya relations